Yakus v. United States, 321 U.S. 414 (1944), was a decision by the United States Supreme Court which upheld congressional power to fetter judicial review and to delegate broad and flexible law-making power to an administrative agency in this constitutional challenge to the Emergency Price Control Act of 1942. The wartime anti-inflation measure, intended to expedite price control enforcement, conferred on the federal district courts jurisdiction over violations of Office of Price Administration (OPA) regulations made under the act. But judicial power to consider the constitutionality of such regulations was excepted. Congress specified that challenges to their validity be initially reviewed under stringent time limitations by the OPA and on appeal exclusively by a special Article III tribunal in the District of Columbia—the Emergency Court of Appeals—and thereafter by the Supreme Court.

Background
Massachusetts meat dealer Albert Yakus, criminally prosecuted for violating the wholesale beef price ceiling, had failed to launch a procedurally difficult pre-enforcement attack on the OPA regulations constitutionality and was barred from collateral challenges during his trial. The Court affirmed his conviction, holding that “so long as there is an opportunity … for judicial review which satisfies the demands of due process,” the bifurcated enforcement and constitutional proceedings were permissible (p. 444). In dissent, Wiley Rutledge, with Frank Murphy, asserted that once Congress conferred jurisdiction, it could not compel the district judges to ignore Marbury v. Madison or violate the Constitution by enforcing the criminal sanctions, a statute, and regulations devoid of due process. 

A Yakus‐like incontestability provision reached the Court in Adamo Wrecking Co. v. United States (1978). Statutory construction facilitated evasion of the constitutional issues, but Lewis Powell, concurring, questioned the validity of Yakus except as an exercise of war powers. Nevertheless, modern environmental legislation contains judicial review schemes similar to that upheld in Yakus. 

Justice Roberts, who also dissented, embraced the non-delegation doctrine argument and held that the OPA had exercised unconstitutionally delegated congressional powers. The New Deal Court majority reacted by stipulating that statutory standards need only be sufficiently defined to permit ascertainment of the administrative agency's obedience to the congressional will.

Implications for Administrative Law

The Supreme Court's decision of Yakus v. United States was a major decision in determining the development of American administrative law.  in particular, Yakus addressed the misunderstood nondelegation doctrine.  In the majority opinion, Chief Justice Stone argued that an administrative agency could correct a problem of delegation if it limited its own power: 

The standards prescribed by the present Act, with the aid of the "statement of the considerations" required to be made by the Administrator, are sufficiently definite and precise to enable Congress, the courts and the public to ascertain whether the administrator, in fixing the designated prices, has conformed to those standards . . . Hence we are unable to find in them an unauthorized delegation of legislative power. 

Thus, Yakus held that an administrative agency could "save" an otherwise unconstitutional delegation of power through a narrowing construction that constrains the agency's own discretion.  This would become a key principle in American constitutional law and would be followed by lower courts in striking down challenges to laws based on the nondelegation doctrine for the next fifty years.  This Yakus principle was logically flawed however: how could an administrative agency itself cure a problem of delegation?  If the problem of delegation is one of excessive legislative power transferred to the executive branch, then the actual delegation problem happens at the time of the passage of the statute—the act of an executive agency limiting that power is too late and does not correct the problem (it really only limits the problem).  As some say, allowing the agency to correct a delegation problem is liking locking the barn doors after all the horses have already escaped.  

The Supreme Court finally came to this conclusion in Whitman v. American Trucking Associations, Inc..  In so doing, Justice Scalia denied that the Supreme Court had ever adopted such a stance on constitutional law: "We have never suggested that an agency can cure an unlawful delegation of legislative power by adopting in its discretion a limiting construction of the statute."  Thus, in striking down its previous jurisprudence, the Supreme Court seems to have forgotten about its holding in Yakus.

See also
List of United States Supreme Court cases, volume 321

References

Further reading

External links
 

United States Supreme Court cases
United States Supreme Court cases of the Stone Court
1944 in United States case law
United States nondelegation doctrine case law